James Alfred Farrior  (born January 6, 1975) is a former American football linebacker who played fifteen seasons in the National Football League (NFL). He played college football for the University of Virginia. He played with the New York Jets and the Pittsburgh Steelers, and earned two Super Bowl rings with the Steelers (XL and XLIII).

Early years
Farrior was born in Ettrick, Virginia. He was a Parade High School All-America selection and named Virginia's Group AA Co-Offensive Player of the Year as senior at Matoaca High School in his hometown and birthplace of Ettrick, Virginia.  He was also selected first-team All-Conference at both FB and LB, also earned All-Metro and All-State honors, he was The Richmond Times-Dispatch co-Player of the Year after posting 78 tackles, 11 sacks, five blocked kicks, four forced fumbles and two interceptions, he rushed the ball 105 times for 1,006 (9.6 avg.) and 22 touchdown and had 19 receptions for 340 yards (17.9 avg.) and 4 touchdowns receiving as a senior fullback. He earned All-Metro, district and region honors as a junior, lettered three times in football, track and wrestling.

College career
Farrior played for coach George Welsh's Virginia Cavaliers football team while attending the University of Virginia. During his career there, he racked up 381 tackles, ranking him third on the school's all-time list. In 1996 season, Farrior earned All-Atlantic Coast Conference first-team honors as a senior while registering 107 tackles, 13 tackles for a loss, 7 passes defensed, and 6.5 sacks. He even played against his future head coach, Mike Tomlin, while Tomlin was a wide receiver at William & Mary.

In 1995 season as a junior he earned All-ACC second-team honors after he started every game at LOLB and led the team in tackles (122 stops) and also had half sack, nine passes defensed and an interception. In 1994, he earned all-ACC honorable mention as a sophomore when he started every game at LOLB and finished second on the team in tackles with 100, 1 sack, a blocked punt, 4 interceptions and 6 passes defensed. During 1993, as a freshman he appeared in 10 games and had 52 tackles, placing him seventh on the team, despite not starting any games, he earned ACC Newcomer of the Week honors when he came off the bench to register 18 tackles vs. Ohio. He had seven tackles and a fumble recovery vs. Boston College in the Carquest Bowl.

He graduated in four years with a bachelor's degree in psychology.

Professional career

New York Jets
Farrior began his pro career in 1997 as the 8th overall pick for the New York Jets. Until 2001, Farrior played sparingly as a reserve outside linebacker, playing in only 27 games from 1997 through 2000. In 2001, Farrior broke out and recorded 142 tackles, 106 of which were solo, one sack and two interceptions. After the 2001 season, the Jets allowed Farrior to leave via free agency, but his career exploded once he got to the Pittsburgh Steelers and was put back in his college position, ILB.

Pittsburgh Steelers
In his first year with the Pittsburgh Steelers, Farrior recorded 82 tackles throughout 14 games. In 2003, he recorded 141 tackles and one interception. During the 2004 season, his third with the franchise, Farrior made 94 tackles, three sacks, and a career-high four interceptions. He also finished second behind Ed Reed for NFL Defensive Player of the Year honors.  During the Pittsburgh Steelers 2005 campaign Farrior missed 2 games due to injury, but performed well in the 14 regular season games and 4 post-season games in which he appeared. His best regular season performance came in a week 3 loss to the New England Patriots, in which he recorded 9 tackles and 1 sack. Farrior's best performance in the post-season came in the AFC Divisional playoffs against the Indianapolis Colts, where Farrior recorded 10 tackles and 2.5 sacks. He finished the season with 119 tackles and a Super Bowl ring. In 2006, he played in all 16 games and recorded 126 tackles, four sacks and one interception. Farrior finished the 2007 season with 94 tackles and 6.5 sacks, a career-high, along with one interception. Entering the 2008 season, Farrior stated that he wished to remain a Steeler for the remainder of his career. In August 2008, Farrior signed a five-year, US$18.25 million contract with the Steelers. The deal included a $5 million signing bonus. At the end of the 2010 season, Farrior and the Steelers appeared in Super Bowl XLV against the Green Bay Packers. He was a starter in the game and recorded two total tackles in the 31–25 loss. He was released on March 2, 2012. On September 25, 2020, it was announced that James is a member of the Pittsburgh Steelers Class of 2020 Hall of Honor (aka Ring of Honor).

NFL statistics

VA Hall of Fame Induction 
In 2016, Farrior was inducted into the Virginia Sports Hall of Fame in Portsmouth, Virginia. 
He was also a nominee for the 2020 Pro Football Hall of Fame. Farrior is a member of the Class of 2020 Pittsburgh Steelers Hall of Honor.

Personal
He is nicknamed "Potsie" by his parents, Rebecca and James Farrior, because he had a pot-belly as a child and because of the popularity of the sit-com Happy Days.  Farrior has garnered several nicknames among fans, too; one being "The Ultimate Farrior", a play on words in reference to explosive WWF wrestler The Ultimate Warrior.
He is the older brother of former NFL linebacker, Matt Farrior. In July 2012, Farrior wed. He and his wife, Iman, reside in Los Angeles, California.

James and his brother Matt Farrior have been recognized for their charitable contributions and actions and have created their own foundation - The James Farrior Foundation. The foundation runs a variety of programs to assist those in need through all stages of life.  The Impact 51 program provides guidance and mentoring for students, the Farrior Scholarship Fund provides college financial assistance to eligible students and the Families in Crisis program provides assistance in many forms to families in need. In addition to their own organization, James and Matt work with the National Bone Marrow Registry.  For these and other contributions to those less fortunate, the Farrior Foundation was given the Key to the City of Richmond, VA by Richmond's Mayor Dwight C. Jones in June 2009. James Farrior is also a recipient of the Bravo award given by the Chesterfield Public Education Foundation which recognizes Extraordinary Alumni of the Chesterfield County Public Schools.

References

External links

 James Farrior at NFL.com
 Steelers Player Bio
 The James Farrior Foundation

1975 births
Living people
Sportspeople from Petersburg, Virginia
African-American players of American football
Virginia Cavaliers football players
American football middle linebackers
New York Jets players
Pittsburgh Steelers players
American Conference Pro Bowl players
Players of American football from Virginia
People from Ettrick, Virginia
21st-century African-American sportspeople
20th-century African-American sportspeople